Luis Jaime Salom Horrach (7 August 1991 – 3 June 2016) was a Spanish Grand Prix motorcycle racer. Salom died after a practice accident at Circuit de Catalunya, when making contact with his bike and the wall after a high-speed accident. Racing in the Moto2 class since 2014, he finished 41 races, with 3 podium appearances, including a second-place finish at the 2016 Qatar season opener. At the time of his death, Salom ranked 10th in the 2016 Moto2 Championship point standings.  Previously he had competed in Moto3, accumulating nine race victories, finishing 2nd and 3rd in the 2012 and 2013 championships, respectively.

Career

Early career
Born in Palma de Mallorca, Salom started racing competitively from the age of eight, winning the 50 cc Balearic Supermotard championship. He progressed up into 125cc championships from 2005 onwards, again becoming Balearic champion for two years in succession, before moving into the CEV Buckler championship in 2007.

In his first full season in the national championship, Salom finished seventh in the series, with a single podium coming in Catalunya. He also took part in the Red Bull Rookies Cup in 2007, taking fourth place in the championship thanks to a win at Assen and second at Jerez. He continued in the series in 2008 where he would win four of the first five races of the season, to hold a 13-point lead over J. D. Beach. Beach would overhaul Salom by four points by season's end, after Salom retired from races at the Sachsenring and Brno. He also finished second to Efrén Vázquez in the CEV Buckler championship.

125cc World Championship
Salom made his Grand Prix début in a wildcard appearance at the Spanish Grand Prix, finishing 23rd. After another wildcard appearance in Catalunya, Salom moved into the championship full-time, replacing Simone Corsi at the WRB team. In twelve races, Salom amassed 21 points on the Aprilia with sixth at Donington being his best result.

Salom moved to the Lambretta team for the  season. After amassing Lambretta's only point of the season at Jerez, Salom moved to Stipa-Molenaar Racing for the rest of the season, where he would add a further 71 points to his tally, including nine top-ten finishes to enable him to finish 12th in the championship.

Moto3 World Championship
Salom won his first Grand Prix in Indianapolis in 2012, beating Sandro Cortese and Maverick Viñales in a last-lap fight. He also won at Aragon. He finished the championship in second behind Cortese.

He went to Red Bull KTM Ajo for the 2013 season. He dominated most of the season, finishing the first eight races on the podium, including four wins, and led the points standings from Catalunya onwards. In a heavy crash during qualifying for the Indianapolis Grand Prix he broke his heel, but continued to race injured to keep the championship battle in his favour. He finished the race in 5th place, his worst result of the season up to that point and the first time he was off the podium all year. Despite the injury he won the next two races at Brno and Silverstone to extend his points lead before being able to rest his foot and recover. However, his championship hopes were put in serious jeopardy at Motegi where he was the innocent victim of a crash by Isaac Viñales, cousin of title rival Maverick Viñales, when he ran in third place. After remounting he eventually had to retire from the race after a second fall, giving Maverick Viñales and Álex Rins the chance to catch up. Rins later also crashed out, but Viñales finished second, making up decisive 20 points after being on the brink of being out of the championship battle altogether before the last race of the season. At the final round in Valencia only five points covered the top three riders with Salom leading, but he eventually crashed out and rejoined the race far behind, leaving Rins and Viñales to fight for the title until the last corner. Salom crossed the line in 14th and recorded the fastest lap of the race, but only finished third in the final standings despite scoring the most wins of the season.

Moto2 World Championship
Salom signed a contract with Pons Racing that lasted until the end of 2015 to race with former title rival Maverick Viñales. Then during the events in Qatar and Austin, he only scored two points. During the Catalan Grand Prix, he suffered a crash with Jonas Folger, putting both of them out of the race. Salom was taken to hospital after the race, and underwent surgery on a broken right arm.

In 2016, Salom moved to SAG Racing Team partnering with Jesko Raffin. At Qatar Salom finished the race in 2nd place.

Death

On 3 June 2016, with 25 minutes to go during Free Practice 2 for the 2016 Catalan Moto2 Grand Prix, Salom crashed at Europcar (turn 13), resulting in the session being red-flagged. The accident was not recorded by MotoGP cameras, but a security camera near turn 13 managed to capture video of the accident. His bike hit the air fence and bounced upwards, while Salom (who had let go of his bike) slid underneath resulting in him being directly in the crashing bike's path. Salom was rushed to Hospital General de Catalunya, where he died during surgery from injuries sustained in the crash.

As a result of his death, the race used the layout normally used by Formula One, to reduce speeds in the part of the track where Salom had crashed.  Salom's death was the first during a world championship since Italian premier class rider Marco Simoncelli's fatal crash at Sepang during the 2011 Shell Advance Malaysian Grand Prix (which was abandoned and declared a non-event by the FIM).  Further modifications with the chicane location were announced at the end of the 2016 season, with a new motorcycle-only chicane installed before the car chicane.  However, safety issues proved to be an issue and that chicane was not used by MotoGP, with the car chicane used.

The SAG Team that Salom had ridden believed the front of the bike lost control whilst braking over a bump at turn 12. However, telemetry that was provided to MotoGP in an investigation showed that due to a low acceleration at the exit out of turn 11, he had applied the brakes nine metres later than usual, in order to maintain a proper corner speed at turn 12. As a result, he was still on the brakes when he hit an irregularity on the asphalt, as opposed to previous laps where he already had released the brakes on that spot. The stress this produced on the front tyre, caused a loss of grip over the irregularity, resulting in the crash.

During the 2016 FIM MotoGP Awards, it was announced that Salom's number, #39, will be retired in the Moto2 class as a tribute.

Career statistics

Red Bull MotoGP Rookies Cup

Races by year
(key) (Races in bold indicate pole position, races in italics indicate fastest lap)

Grand Prix motorcycle racing

By season

By class

Races by year
(key) (Races in bold indicate pole position, races in italics indicate fastest lap)

References

External links

125cc World Championship riders
Spanish motorcycle racers
1991 births
2016 deaths
Sport deaths in Spain
Motorcycle racers who died while racing
Moto3 World Championship riders
Moto2 World Championship riders
Sportspeople from Palma de Mallorca
Filmed deaths in motorsport